Sir Walter Adams  (16 December 1906 – 21 May 1975) was a British historian and educationalist.

Adams was educated at University College London, and was a lecturer in history at the same institution from 1926 to 1934. He was a Rockefeller Fellow in the United States from 1929 to 1930, and the organising secretary of the Second International Congress of the History of Science and Technology in 1931.

He served as secretary of the Academic Assistance Council from 1933 to 1938, and of the London School of Economics from 1938 to 1946; he also served as Deputy Head of the British Political Warfare Mission in the United States from 1942 to 1944, and as Assistant Deputy Director-General of the Political Intelligence Department of the Foreign Office in 1945.

After the war, he served as secretary of the Inter-University Council for Higher Education in the Colonies from 1946 to 1955; he was the principal of the College of Rhodesia and Nyasaland from 1955 to 1966, and subsequently Director of the London School of Economics from 1967 to 1974.

Adams was appointed Officer of the Order of the British Empire (OBE) in 1945, and Companion of the Order of St Michael and St George (CMG) in 1952. He was knighted in 1970.

References

External links

1906 births
1975 deaths
Alumni of University College London
Academics of University College London
British emigrants to Rhodesia
Knights Bachelor
Academics of the London School of Economics
People educated at Brighton, Hove and Sussex Grammar School
Academic staff of the University of Zimbabwe
British expatriates in Rhodesia
Companions of the Order of St Michael and St George
Officers of the Order of the British Empire
20th-century English historians
Rockefeller Fellows
Heads of universities and colleges in Zimbabwe